Syricoris is a genus of moths belonging to the subfamily Olethreutinae of the family Tortricidae.

The genus Syricoris is sometimes included in the closely related genus Celypha.

Species
Syricoris apicipunctana (Walsingham, 1891)
Syricoris astrana (Guenee, 1845)
Syricoris lacunana ([Denis & Schiffermuller], 1775)
Syricoris perexiguana (Kuznetzov, 1988)
Syricoris rivulana (Scopoli, 1763)
Syricoris tiedemanniana (Zeller, 1845)

See also
List of Tortricidae genera

References

External links
Tortricidae.com
Catalogue of Life
Global species
Universal Biological Indexer

Olethreutini
Tortricidae genera